Manuel Haas (born 7 May 1996) is an Austrian professional footballer who plays for German 3. Liga side VfL Osnabrück.

Club career
On 17 August 2020, he signed with SV Ried.

International career
He was the member of Austria Under-17 squad for 2013 UEFA European Under-17 Championship and 2013 FIFA U-17 World Cup, but remained on the bench in all games. He played in the first two games at the 2015 UEFA European Under-19 Championship as Austria was eliminated at group stage.

References

External links
 
 

1996 births
Living people
Austrian footballers
Austria youth international footballers
Austria under-21 international footballers
Kapfenberger SV players
FC Liefering players
NK Inter Zaprešić players
SV Ried players
VfL Osnabrück players
Austrian Football Bundesliga players
2. Liga (Austria) players
Croatian Football League players
3. Liga players
Association football defenders
Austrian expatriate footballers
Austrian expatriate sportspeople in Croatia
Expatriate footballers in Croatia
Austrian expatriate sportspeople in Germany
Expatriate footballers in Germany